Chestnut Hill is a suburb of Keswick, England, located along the A591 road. It contains the Nether Place Nursing Home and Claremont House, a 19th-century lodge which is an AA 4 diamond hotel.

References

External links
Search for sources in google books

Keswick, Cumbria